V.League Division 2 (V2) and V.League Division 3 (V3) are the second- and third-level volleyball leagues for both men and women in Japan. For women tournament, was only held in Division 2

History

The league started in 1998 as V1 League.
In 2006 the name of V1.League was changed in the V.Challenge League.
The Champion and runner-up team could play the replacement game with lower place teams of V.premier League.

On 2 February 2014 Japan Volleyball League Organization announced that:
 V.Challenge League will be divided into V.Challenge League 1 and V.Challenge League 2 from next season.
 V.Challenge League 1 include higher 8 teams in the 2014-15 season.
 V.Challenge League 2 include lower teams in the 2014-15 season.
 Associate teams of JVL will play in the V.Challenge League 2.
 Bottom team of V.Challenge League 1 and top team of V.Challenge League 2 will compete a Promotion and relegation match except associate teams.

In 2018–2019 season, V.League (Japan) was reorganized and renamed with V.League Division 2 replacing V.Challenge League 1 and V.League Division 3 replacing V.Challenge League 2.

V.League Division 2

Men 

Season 2022/23(10 clubs)

Previous results 
Season 2021–22 (15 clubs)

Women 
Season 2022/23(11 clubs)

Previous results 
Season 2021–22 (10 clubs)

Season winners

V.League Division 3 
V.League Division 3 is held only men's tournament

Current clubs and results 
This is the men's clubs roster in 2021–22 season (4 clubs)

Previous winners

See also 
 V.League Division 1

References

External links 
 http://www.vleague.jp/ - V.League official website (Japanese)

Volleyball competitions in Japan
Sports leagues in Japan
Professional sports leagues in Japan